Not Yet: A Memoir of Living and Almost Dying is a biography, written by Canadian writer Wayson Choy, first published in March 2009 by Doubleday Canada. The author recounts his experiences following a combined asthma attack and cardiac arrest.  The book was favorably reviewed in The Globe and Mail, and on straight.com.

References

Canadian autobiographies
Literary autobiographies
Books by Wayson Choy
2009 non-fiction books
Doubleday Canada books
Canadian memoirs